Nimta is a locality in North Dumdum Municipality of North 24 Parganas district in the Indian state of West Bengal. It is a part of the area covered by Kolkata Metropolitan Development Authority (KMDA).

Geography

Location
If Nimta is in the Center; then the East is Birati and Durganagar; West is Kamarhati and Belghoria; North is Agarpara and Panihati and South is Dumdum Cantonment and Baranagar. Nimta Is The Heart Of these Places.
Dumdum/Kolkata Airport is just few minutes away from Nimta and it is towards the South-East direction. Dakshineswar is also just few minutes away from Nimta and it is towards the South-West direction.

96% of the population of Barrackpore subdivision (partly presented in the map alongside, all places marked on the map are linked in the full screen map) lives in urban areas. In 2011, it had a density of population of 10,967 per km2. The subdivision has 16 municipalities and 24 census towns.

For most of the cities/ towns information regarding density of population is available in the Infobox. Population data is not available for neighbourhoods. It is available for the entire municipal area and thereafter ward-wise.

Police station
Nimta police station under Barrackpore Police Commissionerate has jurisdiction over North Dumdum municipal area.

Kolkata Urban Agglomeration
The following Municipalities, Census Towns and other locations in Barrackpore subdivision were part of Kolkata Urban Agglomeration in the 2011 census: Kanchrapara (M), Jetia (CT), Halisahar (M), Balibhara (CT), Naihati (M), Bhatpara (M), Kaugachhi (CT), Garshyamnagar (CT), Garulia (M), Ichhapur Defence Estate (CT), North Barrackpur (M), Barrackpur Cantonment (CB), Barrackpore (M), Jafarpur (CT), Ruiya (CT), Titagarh (M), Khardaha (M), Bandipur (CT), Panihati (M), Muragachha (CT) New Barrackpore (M), Chandpur (CT), Talbandha (CT), Patulia (CT), Kamarhati (M), Baranagar (M), South Dumdum (M), North Dumdum (M), Dum Dum (M), Noapara (CT), Babanpur (CT), Teghari (CT), Nanna (OG), Chakla (OG), Srotribati (OG) and Panpur (OG).

Transport
Nimta is located at the southern terminus of Kalyani Expressway. Madhusudan Banerjee Road (M.B. Road) connects Nimta with Belgharia (westwards) and Birati and Jessore Road (eastwards) (towards the northern end of Dumdum/Kolkata Airport). Nimta is also connected to Nandannagar (westwards) via Shahid Bimalendu Roy Chowdhury Road. It will be soon connected with Kolkata Metro at Birati.

Bus

Private Bus
 201 Nimta Post Office - Salt Lake Sector-5
 DN2 Dakshineswar – Barasat

Mini Bus
 S185 Nimta Paikpara - Howrah Station

Train
The nearest railway stations are Belgharia railway station on the Sealdah-Ranaghat line and Birati railway station on the Sealdah-Bangaon line.

Education
The following schools are located in Nimta & Nearby:
 Nimta High School at Nimta is a boys only higher secondary school. It was established in 1875.
 Udaypur Haradayal Nag Adarsha Vidyalaya. V to x only boys. Xi & xii co-ed.
 Udaypur Haradayal Nag Adarsha Vidyalaya for Girls.
 Belgharia Mahakali Girls High School.
 Jatiya Vidyaniketan Girls High School.
 Jatin Das vidyamandir for boys.
 Jatin Das vidyamandir for girls.
 Nimta Alipur School. Co-ed . Madhyamik.
 Shyamaprasad Nagar High School at Nimta is a co-educational higher secondary school.
 Nimta Jibantosh Memorial Girls High School is a girls only, higher secondary school.
 Nimta Ishan Chandra Balika Vidyalaya is a girls only high school.

See also 
Belgharia, Neighbourhood in North 24 Parganas, West Bengal, India
Birati, Neighbourhood in North 24 Parganas, West Bengal, India

References

Cities and towns in North 24 Parganas district
Neighbourhoods in North 24 Parganas district
Neighbourhoods in Kolkata
Kolkata Metropolitan Area